Yetlington is a village in the civil parish of Callaly, in the county of Northumberland, England.

Yetlington seems to have been known in the Middle Ages as Yatlington, and was owned by the de Clavering family.

Governance 
Yetlington is in the parliamentary constituency of Berwick-upon-Tweed.

References

External links

Villages in Northumberland